Vicente Gómez may refer to:
 Vicente Gómez (politician), president of El Salvador
 Vicente Gómez (composer), Spanish guitarist and composer
 Vicente Gómez (footballer, born 1971), Spanish football defender and manager
 Vicente Gómez (footballer, born 1988), Spanish football midfielder